Jin Shunkai (born 19 October 2001) is a Chinese footballer currently playing as a defender for Shanghai Shenhua.

Career statistics

Club
.

Notes

References

2001 births
Living people
Chinese footballers
China youth international footballers
Association football defenders
China League Two players
Shanghai Shenhua F.C. players